Buck Mason is an American men's clothing brand founded in Los Angeles, California. The brand conducts its business online and through its brick and mortar retail locations.

History 
Founded in 2013 by Erik Allen and Sasha Koehn, Midwest natives, Buck Mason produces t-shirts, denim jeans, chino pants and button-ups along with a handful of branded menswear products. The brand has a total of 23 brick and mortar retail locations in Los Angeles, New York, Chicago, Austin, Houston, Atlanta and Nashville, although the business remains a predominantly e-commerce driven company.

Publicity 
The brand has received publicity via GQ when the magazine featured Tom Brady wearing a Buck Mason tee in its 2016 Man of the Year photo shoot.

References 

Clothing brands of the United States
Jeans by brand
Companies based in Los Angeles County, California